Victor Duane Payne Jr. (July 3, 1899 – October 26, 1981) was an American college basketball and college football coach. He was the head football coach at Abilene Christian College and Simmons University. Payne was also the basketball head coach at Texas Technological College—now known as Texas Tech University.

Coaching career

Football

Abilene Christian
Payne was the fourth head college football coach at Abilene Christian University in Abilene, Texas, and he held that position for two seasons, from 1922 until 1923. During his time at Abilene Christian, Sam Cox of Ozona, Texas, sent him a young wildcat named Bob Thomas to serve as a live athletics mascot for the college.

Payne's coaching record at Abilene Christian was 12–3.

Simmons
Payne coached the Simmons Cowboys football team to 6–1–3 in 1926.

Texas Tech
Payne served as an assistant coach during the 1927 and 1928 seasons under Texas Tech head coach Ewing Y. Freeland.

Basketball

Texas Tech
Payne coached the Texas Tech Matadors (now known as the Red Raiders) from 1927 to 1930. During the first season, the team won ten games and lost six. The following season, the record was slightly worse at 9–8. During his final season, the team improved to 13–6. Payne's overall record at Texas Tech stands at 32 wins and 20 losses.

Later life
In 1949, he was working for the Abilene Savings and Loan Company.

Head coaching record

Football

References

External links
 

1899 births
1981 deaths
Abilene Christian Wildcats football coaches
Abilene Christian Wildcats football players
Abilene Christian Wildcats men's basketball coaches
American football halfbacks
American men's basketball coaches
Basketball coaches from Texas
Bethany Bison football players
College track and field coaches in the United States
Hardin–Simmons Cowboys football coaches
Hardin–Simmons Cowboys football players
Players of American football from Texas
Texas Tech Red Raiders basketball coaches
Texas Tech Red Raiders football coaches
Texas Tech Red Raiders track and field coaches
Coaches of American football from Texas